Josh Stowers is a Democratic former member of the West Virginia House of Delegates, serving from 2009 to 2013. Stowers resigned from the legislature to take a job as Deputy State Treasurer of West Virginia. Stowers was also previously an assistant principal at Horace Mann Middle School.

Stowers was elected to a six-year term as a Lincoln County Commissioner in November 2018.

References

External links
 
Twitter account

Living people
Democratic Party members of the West Virginia House of Delegates
1979 births
Politicians from Spartanburg, South Carolina
Concord University alumni
Marshall University alumni